Concordia Parish borders the Mississippi River in eastern central Louisiana. As of the 2020 census, the population was 18,687. The parish seat is Vidalia. The parish was formed in 1807.

Concordia Parish is part of the Natchez, MS–LA Micropolitan Statistical Area. It is historically considered part of the Natchez District, devoted to cotton cultivation as a commodity crop, in contrast to the sugar cane crop of southern Louisiana. Other Louisiana parishes of similar character are East and West Carroll, Madison and Tensas, all in this lowlying delta land. On the east side of the Mississippi River is the Natchez District around the city of Natchez, Mississippi.

History

Prehistory

Concordia Parish was the home to many successive Native American cultures for thousands of years before European encounter. Peoples of the Marksville culture, Troyville culture, Coles Creek culture and Plaquemine culture built villages and earthwork mound sites throughout the area. Notable examples include Cypress Grove Mound, DePrato Mounds, Frogmore Mound Site, and Lamarque Landing Mound.

Historic Native American tribes encountered by early French explorers and colonists were the following:

Historic era
Concordia was named by Anglo-American settlers for a Latin word meaning "harmony". They came mostly after the Louisiana Purchase of 1803, when the United States took over this formerly French colonial area west of the Mississippi. Like other parishes of the lands along the Mississippi River, in the antebellum era, the parish was developed for cotton cultivation on large plantations. The labor-intensive crop was profitable because of the labor of enslaved African Americans.

In 1789, Don Jose Vidal a resident of Natchez, MS and later the founder of the city of Vidalia, LA asked for land grants to move his family from Natchez to the other side of the Mississippi River. In Natchez, there was a mansion built called Concord (Natchez, Mississippi), this
was a residence lived in by Spanish governors, also Vidal and his family lived there before the time era of the US began.

The Mansion started the name "Concord" and ultimately later led to the birth of what would be Concordia Parish. During the year of 1804, a ceremony of transfer was held and the citizens and Mayor of Natchez crossed over to the Louisiana side of the Mississippi to honor the new land that was founded. The Mansion was later struct by fire in the early 20th century (1901) and burned down. Natchez people also lived on both sides of the land.

"Concordia County" was a creation of the first Legislative Council held in New Orleans on December 2, 1804. Its territory that included parts of the present parishes of East Carroll, Madison, and Tensas. Land between the Mississippi, Red, Black, and Tensaw rivers comprised the early local administration of Concordia.

Because Concordia's alluvial soil was unusually productive for cotton growing, it attracted large plantations, whose owners enslaved a very high number of people. In 1860, slaves made up 91 percent of Concordia Parish's residents, the highest percentage of any Louisiana parish. Only two counties in the United States — Washington and Issaquena counties in Mississippi — had a higher percentage of its population enslaved. As might be expected, the small number of white cotton planters in Concordia were fierce defenders of chattel slavery and strongly backed the Confederacy during the American Civil War.

Law and government
The current elected sheriff is David Hedrick.

The parish trends Democratic for local offices. For national offices, the majority has favored Republican candidates. In the 2008 presidential election, the Democrat Barack Obama of Illinois received 3,766 votes (39.5 percent) in Concordia Parish to 5,668 (59.5 percent) for the Republican nominee, John McCain of Arizona. In 2004, Concordia Parish cast 5,427 votes (60 percent) for President George W. Bush and 3,446 ballots (38 percent) for his Democratic rival, Senator John F. Kerry of Massachusetts.

Geography

The parish is completely agricultural bottomlands. The Ouachita River runs along the west boundary, the Red River along the south, and the Mississippi River along the east. All three rivers are contained by large levee systems.

Major highways
  U.S. Highway 65
  U.S. Highway 84
  Louisiana Highway 15
  Louisiana Highway 566

Adjacent counties and parishes
 Tensas Parish  (north)
 Adams County, Mississippi  (northeast)
 Wilkinson County, Mississippi  (east)
 West Feliciana Parish  (southeast)
 Pointe Coupee Parish  (south)
 Avoyelles Parish  (southwest)
 Catahoula Parish  (west)

National protected area
 Bayou Cocodrie National Wildlife Refuge

State protected area
 Richard K. Yancey Wildlife Management Area

Demographics

2020 census

As of the 2020 United States census, there were 18,687 people, 7,162 households, and 4,562 families residing in the parish.

2000 census
As of the census of 2000, there were 20,247 people, 7,521 households, and 5,430 families residing in the parish. There were 9,148 housing units at an average density of 13 per square mile (5/km2). The racial makeup of the parish was 57.9% White, 40.7% Black or African American, 0.16% Native American, 0.3% Asian, 0.55% from other races, and 0.8% from two or more races.  1.2% of the population were Hispanic or Latino of any race.

There were 7,521 households, out of which 33.00% had children under the age of 18 living with them, 49.00% were married couples living together, 19.00% had a female householder with no husband present, and 27.80% were non-families. 25.30% of all households were made up of individuals, and 11.50% had someone living alone who was 65 years of age or older.  The average household size was 2.60 and the average family size was 3.12.

In the parish the population was spread out, with 27.80% under the age of 18, 8.90% from 18 to 24, 25.60% from 25 to 44, 23.00% from 45 to 64, and 14.70% who were 65 years of age or older.  The median age was 37 years. For every 100 females, there were 95.20 males.  For every 100 females age 18 and over, there were 91.90 males.

The median income for a household in the parish was $22,742, and the median income for a family was $28,629. Males had a median income of $27,453 versus $18,678 for females. The per capita income for the parish was $11,966.  About 24.30% of families and 29.10% of the population were below the poverty line, including 42.00% of those under age 18 and 20.60% of those age 65 or over.

Education
Concordia Parish School Board operates public schools in the parish.

National Guard
1086th Transportation Company of the 165th CSS (Combat Service Support) Battalion of the 139th RSG (Regional Support Group) is based in Vidalia, Louisiana on the west bank of the Mississippi River.

Communities

City 
 Vidalia (parish seat and largest municipality)

Towns
 Ferriday
 Clayton
 Ridgecrest

Census-designated places
 Minorca
 Monterey
 Spokane

Other unincorporated communities
 Acme
 Ashland
 Black Hawk
 Eva
 Fairview
 West Ferriday

Notable people

Arts and entertainment
 Jerry Lee Lewis, musician
 Jimmy Swaggart, televangelist
 Mickey Gilley, musician

Journalism
 Campbell Brown, Emmy-award-winning journalist, CNN Anchor/host.
 Sam Hanna Sr., late publisher of Concordia Sentinel in Ferriday
 Howard K. Smith, ABC and CBS commentator

Politics
 Al Ater, State representative (1984–1988) and secretary of state (2005–2006)
 Leo Boothe, longest-serving District Judge of Concordia Parish and Catahoula Parish (1991−2015)
 Clifford Cleveland Brooks, planter in St. Joseph, represented Concordia Parish in the Louisiana State Senate from 1924 to 1932.
 James H. "Jim" Brown, state senator (1972–1980), Louisiana secretary of state (1980–1988), and insurance commissioner (1992–2000)
 Charles C. Cordill, Louisiana state senator representing Concordia and Tensas parishes from 1884 to 1912
 Noah W. Cross, Concordia Parish sheriff, 1944−1948; 1952−1973
 Brenham C. Crothers, Ferriday cattleman; state senator from delta parishes from 1948 to 1952 and 1956−1960
 Troyce Guice, U.S. Senate candidate, 1966 and 1986
 Bryant Hammett, state representative, 1992–2006
 Shelby M. Jackson, Education superintendent, 1948–1964
 Consuelo Montagu, Duchess of Manchester (1858−1909), spent part of her childhood at Ravenswood Place plantation, in the vicinity of Lake St. John.
 Ed Rand, late state representative (1960−1964) from Rapides Parish had a second home on Lake St. John.
 Dan Richey, state senator, 1980–1984
 Fred L. Schiele, state representative (1964−1968), Concordia Parish sheriff (1973−1980)
 J. Robert Wooley, state insurance commissioner (2000−2006); practiced law in Concordia Parish with James H. "Jim" Brown in late 1970s

See also

 National Register of Historic Places listings in Concordia Parish, Louisiana

References

External links

 Heinrich, P. V., 2008, Woodville 30 x 60 minute geologic quadrangle. Louisiana Geological Survey, Baton Rouge, Louisiana.

 
Louisiana parishes
Natchez micropolitan area
Louisiana parishes on the Mississippi River
1807 establishments in the Territory of Orleans
Populated places established in 1807